Mount Sir MacKenzie Bowell is a  mountain peak located at co-ordinates  in the Premier Range of the Cariboo Mountains in the east-central interior of British Columbia, Canada.  The mountain is located between the Kiwa and Tete glaciers.

The name honours the fifth Prime Minister of Canada, Sir Mackenzie Bowell, who died in 1917. It was one of the first mountains in the Premier Range to be named after a Prime Minister, receiving its designation on September 6, 1927. It was originally named Mount Welcome by the Carpe-Chamberlin climbing party in 1924.

External links

Canadian Mountain Encyclopedia listing for Mount Sir MacKenzie Bowell
British Columbia Government Information Sheet on Mount Sir MacKenzie Bowell

Three-thousanders of British Columbia
Cariboo Mountains
Cariboo Land District